The Nursery (Detskaya, literally Children's [Room]) is a song cycle by Modest Mussorgsky set to his own lyrics, composed between 1868 and 1872.
The cycle was published in two series. Only the first two songs survive of the second series.

Synopses

Series 1: The Nursery
1. With Nanny (B-flat major)

A child begs the nurse to tell a story, first about the awful bogey-man who carries naughty children into the forest and devours them, and later about a fairy-tale Tsar and Tsaritsa who live in a rich palace by the sea.

2. In the Corner (F major)

The nurse berates Mishenka for spoiling her knitting and sends him to the corner.

3. The Beetle (F major)

A child relates to the nurse an encounter with a large beetle.

4. With the Doll (A-flat major)

A child sings a lullaby to her doll.

5. At Bedtime (A-flat major)

A child recites his prayers.

Series 2: At the Dacha
The two surviving songs of Series 2 (Na Dache, At the Dacha) along with a new edition of the five songs of Series 1, were published by V. Bessel and Co. in 1908.

1. Ride on a Hobby Horse (D-flat major)

A child relating his imaginary journey to Yukki on a stick (hobby horse) falls, injures himself, and resumes his journey.

2. The Cat 'Sailor' (A major)

A child foils the attempt by Matros ("Sailor") the cat to catch the family canary.

3. Dream

A child's fantastic dream

4. [Unknown title]

A quarrel between two children

Publication history

Notes
 The song cycle was arranged for soprano and orchestra by Edison Denisov in 1976 and premiered in 1979.
 An orchestral (no voice) version was arranged by Peter Breiner and recorded in 2012 by him with the New Zealand Symphony Orchestra on Naxos.
 A version with orchestral accompaniment was arranged by the Israeli composer Noam Sheriff.

References

Sources
 Calvocoressi, M.D., Abraham, G., Mussorgsky, 'Master Musicians' Series, London: J.M.Dent & Sons, Ltd., 1974
 Calvocoressi, M.D., Modest Mussorgsky: His Life and Works, London: Rockliff, 1956
 Orlova, A., Mussorgsky Remembered, translated by Zaytsev, V. and Morrison, F., Bloomington: Indiana University Press, 1991
 Unknown compiler, notes to Moussorgsky: Integrale des Melodies CD recording by Boris Christoff, EMI Records Ltd, 1989

External links
 

Song cycles by Modest Mussorgsky
1872 compositions
Classical song cycles in Russian